Cheddleton Flint Mill is a water mill situated in the village of Cheddleton in the English county of Staffordshire. The mill race takes water from the river Churnet. The site is believed to have been used for milling since the Middle Ages.  However, the present structures mainly date from the period of the Industrial Revolution, although there is evidence of some earlier work surviving.

There are actually two mills: one is a late 18th century structure which was purpose-built to grind flint for use in the pottery industry, and the other was converted to the same purpose from use as a corn-mill. The mill complex includes a miller's cottage, two flint kilns, a drying kiln and outbuildings, and is adjacent to the Caldon Canal.

Conservation
The complex was listed grade II* in 1986 (the buildings being separately listed). It is now maintained and operated by the Cheddleton Flint Mill Industrial Heritage Trust, a registered charity under English law.

See also
 Listed buildings in Cheddleton
 Moddershall
 Etruria Industrial Museum

References

External links
Cheddleton Flint Mill web site

Watermills in Staffordshire
Museums in Staffordshire
Grade II* listed buildings in Staffordshire
Grade II* listed museum buildings
Industry museums in England
Open-air museums in England
Mill museums in England